The pahu or pau is a traditional musical instrument found in Polynesia: Hawaii, Tahiti, Cook Islands, Samoa, and Tokelau. Carved from a single log and covered on the playing end with a stretched sharkskin, the pahu is played with the palms and fingers of the hand. It is considered a sacred instrument and was generally kept in a temple (heiau), and used to accompany a repertoire of  sacred songs called hula pahu/ura pau.

The Hawaiian term Pahu translates into 'drum,' ‘Niu’ being the Hawaiian word for ‘coconut.'  Although there are a number of specific types of percussion instruments used in Hawaiian cultural expressions of music, the Pahu is perhaps one of the most important percussion devices known to Hawaii, both ancient and modern, of the four main indigenous musical types (wooden drums, knee drums, calabash drums, and bamboo pipes).

Pahu may be found in the Hawaiian Islands in two main and distinctly different, but contextually related forms. The first is regarded as the Heiau Pahu, or religious drum (also known as the Pahu Pu’ule, or 'prayer drum'). The second has come to us in the form of the Hula Pahu, or musical accompaniment drum (sometimes referred to as the Pahu Mele, or song accompaniment drum). Both types of drum have a common ancient historical source.

The Pahu drum is a staple in traditional Hawaiian dance, providing a basic rhythmic accompaniment. The drums' tall, narrow body is carved from wood, usually from a segment of a coconut tree trunk, and the head is made from dried sharkskin.  The traditional Hawaiian Pahu was made from a sectioned and seasoned wooden tree trunk, preferably of coconut wood, although possibly other types of native wood may have been used. The original material used for the Pahu's waha (head) was either shark or ray skin. Heiau Pahu tended to be originally made with a waha of ray skin, while non-religious Pahu often used sharkskin. The Pahu is played with the bare hands and fingers.

See also
Hula
Pate (musical instrument)

References

Hand drums
Sacred musical instruments
Hawaiian musical instruments
Māori musical instruments
Tahitian music
Tahitian culture